Jan Christian Ehler (born 17 August 1963) is a German politician who has been serving as a Member of the European Parliament since 2004. He is a member of the Christian Democratic Union, part of the European People's Party.

Early life and education
Ehler grew up in Munich and graduated from Staatliches Landschulheim Marquartstein in 1984.

 1992/1993 PhD in political science in the field of the "US commercial policy" at Ludwig Maximilian University of Munich
 1986-1991 Studies in the field of journalism, political science and macroeconomics at Ludwig Maximilian University of Munich, traineeship at Deutsche Journalistenschule
1989/1990 Studies in the field of macroeconomics at the American University Washington D.C., research associate for the United States House Committee on Financial Services

During his studies, he completed internships with Otto Graf Lambsdorff and Senator John Heinz.

Early career
 Managing Director, Biotech GmbH - biotechnology centre Hennigsdorf (since 2000)
 Managing Director, Projektgesellschaft Bahnerprobungs- und Technologiezentrum (special testing and technology company) Berlin/Brandenburg GmbH (GBT) (1998–2000)
 Member of staff, project head and subsequently Managing Director of the Aigner group of companies (1992–1997)
 Assistant to the Managing Director, ddp/ADN (1990–1991)

Political career

Career on state politics
Ehler was first elected into the State Parliament of Brandenburg in the 1999 state elections. A member of the CDU parliamentary group, he served as spokesperson on industry and technology policies. He was a member of the Committee on Economic Affairs and the Committee on European Affairs and Development Policies. In addition, he served as substitute member of the Committee on Budgetary and Financial Affairs.

Member of the European Parliament, 2004–present
Ehler has been a Member of the European Parliament since the 2004 European elections. A member of the European People's Party group, he first served on the Committee on Economic and Monetary Affairs (ECON) from 2005 until 2009 before joining the Committee on Industry, Research and Energy (ITRE) and the Subcommittee on Security and Defence (SEDE). He is currently one of the Parliament's rapporteurs on Horizon Europe, the EU research and innovation framework programme. Since 2022, he has been chairing the parliament’s Panel for the Future of Science and Technology (STOA).

In addition to his committee assignments, Ehler has served as member of the Parliament's delegations for relations with the countries of South Asia and the South Asia Association for Regional Cooperation (2004-2007), India (2007-2009) and the United States (since 2012). He also chairs the European Parliament Intergroup on Creative Industries.

Political memberships
 MIT, Germany (October 2003-November 2007), Federal Vice-Chairman
 CDU Regional Executive Board, Brandenburg (since Mai 2003), Member
 Executive Board of the EPP Small and Medium Entrepreneurs' Union, Brussels (March 2003- Mai 2007), Member
 CDU District Executive Board, Oberhavel (since December 2001), Member
 CDU small businesses association (MIT), Brandenburg (since November 2000), Regional Chairman

Other activities
 Atlantik-Brücke, Member
 Cyber-Security Council Germany, Associate Member
 European Security Research and Innovation Forum (ESRIF), Member (since September 2007)
 European Security Research Advisory Board (ESRAB), Member (until December 2006)
 German European Security Association (GESA), Member of the Advisory Board
 International Society for Human Rights (IGFM), Member of the Godparenthood Program for Political Prisoners in Cuba
 Künstlerhaus Schloss Wiepersdorf, Member of the Advisory Board
 lit:potsdam Literature Festival, Member of the Board
 Jerusalem Foundation, Member

References

External links
 Official website

1963 births
Living people
MEPs for Germany 2004–2009
Christian Democratic Union of Germany MEPs
MEPs for Germany 2009–2014
MEPs for Germany 2014–2019
MEPs for Germany 2019–2024